John William Ditter Sr. (September 5, 1888 – November 21, 1943) was a Republican member of the U.S. House of Representatives from Pennsylvania.

Biography
John William Ditter Sr. was born in Philadelphia, Pennsylvania on September 5, 1888. He graduated from the Temple University School of Law in Philadelphia in 1913. He worked as a professor of history and commerce in Philadelphia high schools from 1912 to 1925. In 1925 he moved to Ambler, Pennsylvania, and commenced the practice of law. He served as workmen's compensation referee for eastern Pennsylvania in 1929.

Ditter was elected as a Republican to the Seventy-third from the 17th District of Pennsylvania and to the five succeeding Congresses. During his years in Washington, Ditter served on the House Committee on Appropriations. He also was a member of the subcommittee on Navy Department appropriation bills, and at the time of his death was ranking minority member. He  served until his death in an airplane crash near Columbia, Pennsylvania. He is buried in Whitemarsh Memorial Cemetery in Prospectville, Pennsylvania.

His son, John William Ditter Jr. was a federal judge, serving on the United States District Court for the Eastern District of Pennsylvania.

Namesake
 was named for him.

See also
 List of United States Congress members who died in office (1900–49)

References
 Retrieved on 2009-5-18
The Political Graveyard

1888 births
1943 deaths
Accidental deaths in Pennsylvania
Politicians from Philadelphia
American Protestants
Temple University Beasley School of Law alumni
Pennsylvania lawyers
Victims of aviation accidents or incidents in 1943
Victims of aviation accidents or incidents in the United States
Republican Party members of the United States House of Representatives from Pennsylvania
20th-century American politicians
Burials in Pennsylvania
20th-century American lawyers